Dorien Rookmaker (born 30 July 1964) is a Dutch politician of the More Direct Democracy (MDD) party, who has been serving as a Member of the European Parliament since 2020. Initially serving as a non-attached member, she joined the European Conservatives and Reformists in December 2021. She is a member of the Parliament's Committee on Transport and Tourism.

References

1964 births
Living people
European Conservatives and Reformists MEPs
MEPs for the Netherlands 2019–2024
21st-century women MEPs for the Netherlands